John Meek Whitehead (July 29, 1852 – August 31, 1924) was a politician in the state of Wisconsin.

Biography
Whitehead was born on July 29, 1852 to Jacob and Elizabeth Ann Whitehead near Hillsboro, Illinois. He married twice, first on July 12, 1881 to Lavinia Fletcher Barrows, who died in 1888, and second to Julet Claire Thorp on May 15, 1919. He died in Janesville, Wisconsin on August 31, 1924.

Career
Whitehead served in the Wisconsin State Senate from 1896 to 1912. He was a delegate to the 1920 Republican National Convention.

References

People from Hillsboro, Illinois
Politicians from Janesville, Wisconsin
Wisconsin state senators
1852 births
1924 deaths